The Lukasrand Tower is located on Muckleneuk Hill in the Lukasrand suburb of Pretoria, Gauteng, South Africa. The tower was built in 1978 and its primary purpose is wireless telecommunications (e.g., microwave transmission, mobile phone, etc.). It also features an observation deck.  The tower is dressed with branding signs for Telkom SA. For a time (September 2009 to prior to August 2012), the tower also sported a 24-metre, eight storey high, fibreglass soccer ball, for the 2010 World Cup.

References

Sources
 
 
 

Communication towers
Buildings and structures in Pretoria
Observation towers
Towers in South Africa